Puławianie was an informal designation of one of two peer groups of communists in postwar politics of Stalinist Poland, bidding for power within the leadership of the Polish United Workers' Party in spring of 1956, following Bierut's death. They were known as the reformists during Poland's de-Stalinisation process. The other group, dubbed Natolińczycy, was known as the hardliners.

Puławianie united many party members of Jewish origin. The most prominent representatives of the Puławy faction were Roman Zambrowski, and Leon Kasman. The name comes from the chain of apartment buildings at Puławska 24 and 26 streets in Warsaw, which survived the war. These apartments were settled mainly by a very high communist party officials, in which some of the supporters of the Puławianie group lived. The opposed Polish clique within the communist party called them “the Jews.” Witold Jedlicki described the struggle between Natolins and the Pulawians in the booklet “Oafs and Jews”. (Chamy i Żydy)

A young group derived from parents who are members of the Puławians were connected with the March 1968 rebellion in Poland.

See also 
1968 Polish political crisis
Władysław Gomułka
Mieczysław Moczar
Natolin faction
Leon Kasman
Aleksander Zawadzki

References 

1950s in Poland
1960s in Poland
Polish United Workers' Party
20th-century Polish Jews
Communism in Poland
Jewish socialists